The National Insurance Contributions and Statutory Payments Act 2004 (c 3) is an Act of the Parliament of the United Kingdom.

Section 5
Section 5(1) was omitted by section 129 of, and  paragraph 11(c) of Schedule 43 to, the Finance Act 2008.

Section 13 - Commencement
The National Insurance Contributions and Statutory Payments Act 2004 (Commencement) Order 2004 (S.I. 2004/1943 (C. 85)) was made under section 13(1).

References
Halsbury's Statutes,

External links
The National Insurance Contributions and Statutory Payments Act 2004, as amended from the National Archives.
The National Insurance Contributions and Statutory Payments Act 2004, as originally enacted from the National Archives.
Explanatory notes to the National Insurance Contributions and Statutory Payments Act 2004.

United Kingdom Acts of Parliament 2004
National Insurance